Sidney Roberts Stevenson FRIBA (1850 - 21 January 1928) was an English architect based in Nottingham.

Career

He was born in 1850 in Nottingham and educated at Ockbrook School and later in Leamington. He studied at Nottingham School of Art at which he won a 12 month Free Art Studentship and was articled to Richard Charles Sutton. He began independent practice as an architect in Nottingham in 1871 and was initially based in offices in Victoria Street, but later moved to Queen’s Chambers, King Street in Nottingham.

In 1873 he submitted plans into a competition for St Paul’s Church, Chester. Sir Gilbert Scott acted as the judge and awarded the prize to Sidney Stevenson. 

In 1908 he moved from his office in Burns Street and started to work in collaboration with John Rigby Poyser.

He was appointed a Fellow of the Royal Institute of British Architects in 1925.

He married Cecilia Farmer, fourth daughter of John Farmer of Colville Street, Nottingham, at St. John the Baptist's Church, Leenside, Nottingham on 31 July 1873 and they had the following children:
Gertrude M Stevenson (b. 1875)
Mary C. Stevenson (b. 1877)
Norah Roberts Stevenson (b. 1881)
Amy Dorothy Stevenson (b. 1882)

He died on 21 January 1928 in London and left an estate valued at £2,412 16d 7d.

Notable works

References

1850 births
1928 deaths
Architects from Nottingham
Alumni of Nottingham School of Art
Fellows of the Royal Institute of British Architects